Mount Buggery is a mountain located in the Wangaratta Rural City local government area, near Abbeyard above the Buffalo River in the alpine region of Victoria, Australia.

See also

Alpine National Park
List of mountains in Victoria

References

Further reading

Mountains of Victoria (Australia)
Wangaratta
Mountains of Hume (region)